Anupama can refer to:

 Anupama (given name), an Indian female given name (including a list of persons with the name)
Anupama (1955 film), directed by Agradoot
 Anupama (1966 film), directed by Hrishikesh Mukherjee
 Anupama (1981 film), directed by Renuka Sharma
 Anupamaa, a 2020 TV series